Peter Sattmann (born 26 December 1947 in Zwickau) is a German actor and musician.

Biography 
In 1957, Sattmann moved with his parents, Gerda and Ferdinand Sattmann, from Zwickau to Friedrichshafen, where he played in a band when he was twelve years old. He attended the Graf-Zeppelin-Gymnasium up to the eleventh class, when he left to concentrate on acting, moving to Munich and performing as a street musician.

He married when he was 21 years old, and in 1970 his youngest daughter, Katrin Sattmann, was born. He attended the Neue Münchner Schauspielschule, and in 1969 went to the Deutsches Theater in Göttingen. He was voted Schauspieler des Jahres in 1975 and in 1977 at the Württembergisches Staatstheater in Stuttgart.

Sattmann wrote a number of plays for which he directed the first performances, including "Open End", "Der Erzbischof ist da", "Brave New Man" and "Der Fallschirmspringer", and continued until 1990 at the Schiller Theater.

In addition to appearing in films, Sattmann also composed the music for the film "Willkommen im Paradies". He also composed music for “Kerbels Flucht”, “Der Prins muss her” and “Das Familienfest”.

From 1990 to 1998, he lived with Katja Riemann, and their daughter, Paula Riemann was born in 1993.

Filmography
  (1977)
  (1977)
  (1981, TV miniseries)
 Kerbels Flucht (1984, TV film)
 Das Rätsel der Sandbank (1984, TV miniseries)
  (1985)
 Der Prins muß her (1987, TV series)
  (1989, TV film)
 Fool's Mate (1989)
 Le grand secret (1989, TV miniseries)
 Dick Francis Mysteries: In The Frame (1989, TV)
 Von Gewalt keine Rede (1991, TV film)
 Making Up! (1993)
 Gefährliche Verbindung (1993, TV film)
 Nur eine kleine Affäre (1994, TV miniseries)
 Lauras Entscheidung (1994, TV film)
 Bandits (1997)
 Women Don't Lie (1998)
  (1999)
 Men Do What They Can (2012)

References

External links

External links

German male television actors
German film score composers
German theatre directors
People from Zwickau
1947 births
Living people
German male stage actors
German male writers
20th-century German male actors
21st-century German male actors